Thomas Wylie (June 4, 1841 – July 10, 1915) was an Ontario physician and political figure. He represented Simcoe West in the Legislative Assembly of Ontario as a Conservative member from 1886 to 1894.

He was born in Toronto in 1841, the son of John Wylie, a Scottish immigrant. Wylie studied medicine at John Rolph's Toronto School of Medicine, graduating with an M.D. in 1866. In 1867, he married Catherine Ferguson. He practiced medicine in Toronto and Stayner.

External links 
The Canadian parliamentary companion, 1889 JA Gemmill

Victoria County centennial history, W Kirkconnell (1921)

1841 births
1915 deaths
Physicians from Ontario
Progressive Conservative Party of Ontario MPPs
People from Clearview, Ontario